A Fool's Revenge is a 1909 American silent short drama film directed by D. W. Griffith. It is based on the 1832 Victor Hugo play Le roi s'amuse.

Cast
 Owen Moore as The Duke
 Charles Inslee as The Fool
 Marion Leonard as The Daughter

References

External links
 

1909 films
1909 short films
1909 drama films
Silent American drama films
American silent short films
American black-and-white films
Films directed by D. W. Griffith
Films based on works by Victor Hugo
Films set in the 16th century
Films set in France
1900s American films